Kingdom of Might is the second album by American death metal band Woe of Tyrants. Released on January 6, 2009, it marked the band's debut on Metal Blade Records. It was produced by the band and Joey Sturgis.

Track listing
 "Jesu Juva"                               – 0:55
 "Soli Deo Gloria"                         – 5:06
 "Break the Fangs of the Wicked"           - 4:14
 "Pearls Before Swine"                     - 3:37
 "Kingdom of Might (The Eclipse)"          - 4:16
 "Kingdom of Might (Dawn in the Darkness)" - 4:23
 "Sounding Jerusalem"                      - 3:41
 "Sons of Thunder"                         - 3:12
 "The Seven Braids of Samson"              - 4:07
 "Like Jasper and Carnelian"               - 4:34
 "Golgotha"                                - 3:29

Recording band members
Chris Catanzaro - vocals
Chris Burns- guitar
Matt Kincaid - guitar
Adam Kohler - bass
Johnny Roberts - drums

References

2009 albums
Woe of Tyrants albums
Metal Blade Records albums
Albums produced by Joey Sturgis